Baruch Czatzkes of Lusk was a 19th-century Volhynian Hebrew poet and translator.

Franz Delitzsch mentions him as one of the Germanizing Hebrew poets of the Bikkure ha-'Ittim school. His poem "Ha-Bitaḥon" in that periodical is translated from the Russian of Mikhail Kheraskov, likely the first instance of a German Slavic Jew translating Slavonic poetry into Hebrew.  Czatzkes also contributed sixteen proverbs to Bikkure ha'Ittim, and was the author of the poem "Kol anot tefilah", which appeared in the first edition of Isaac Baer Levinsohn's Te'udah be-Yisrael.

References
 

19th-century Jews
Hebrew-language poets
Translators from the Russian Empire
Jewish translators
People from Lutsk
Translators from Russian
Translators to Hebrew
Ukrainian translators